"One Song" is a song by Norwegian hip hop duo Envy. It was released as the lead and only single from their debut studio album The Magic Soup and the Bittersweet Faces (2012). It was released as a digital download in Norway on June 10, 2011. The song has peaked to number 19 in Norway.

Music video
A music video to accompany the release of "One Song" was first released onto YouTube on August 2, 2011 at a total length of four minutes and thirty seconds.

Track listings

Chart performance

Weekly charts

Release history

References

2011 songs
Nico & Vinz songs